Overlook Walk is a proposed bridge over Alaskan Way in Seattle, in the U.S. state of Washington. Slated to be completed in 2025, the bridge will serve as a pedestrian path to connect the Central Waterfront district and Pike Place Market. Construction on the project began in June 2022.

References 

Bridges under construction
Central Waterfront, Seattle
Pike Place Market
Proposed bridges in the United States